Vale of Clara is a national nature reserve of approximately  located in County Wicklow, Ireland. It is managed by the Irish National Parks & Wildlife Service, part of the Department of Housing, Local Government and Heritage.

Features
The Vale of Clara was legally protected as a national nature reserve by the Irish government in 1983. The Special Area of Conservation, Ballygannon Wood, is contained within the Vale of Clara nature reserve.

The Vale of Clara, sometimes known as Clara Vale Forest, is a fragmented oak woodland set over a large area, with the largest semi-natural woods in County Wicklow. It is possibly the largest native hardwood wood in Ireland. This area has been partially covered in trees since the Ice Age. There is also a variety of hazel, willow, holly, and birch trees as well as bluebells, bilberry, honeysuckle, and wood sorrel. Some of the birds which inhabit the woodlands include buzzards, woodcock, tree-creepers, and redstarts alongside fallow deer.

See also
Clara Lara FunPark

References

Geography of County Wicklow
Forests and woodlands of the Republic of Ireland
Nature reserves in the Republic of Ireland
Tourist attractions in County Wicklow